The Hebraization of English (or Hebraicization) is the use of the Hebrew alphabet to write English. Because Hebrew uses an abjad, it can render English words in multiple ways. There are many uses for hebraization, which serve as a useful tool for Israeli learners of English by indicating the pronunciation of unfamiliar letters. An example would be the English name spelled "Timothy", which can be Hebraized as "" in the Hebrew alphabet.

Table

Consonants 

For full spelling, when a reader is likely to err in the reading of a word, the use of niqqud or partial niqqud is recommended.  This is especially true when writing foreign words, unfamiliar words, ambiguous words, or words that take a dagesh.

Final letters
Five letters in Hebrew, Nun, Mem, Tsadi, Pe/Fe, and Kaf, all have final or sofit (Hebrew: סוֹפִית sofit) forms.  That means, that the letters' appearances change when they are at the end of words from כ, פ, צ, מ, נ to ך, ף, ץ, ם, ן respectively.  Final forms are used in transliteration when appropriate, with the exception of foreign words ending in a [p] sound, which retain the non-final form of פ, such as "קטשופ" ("ketchup").

Vowels and diphthongs
Since vowels are not consistent in English, they are more difficult to transliterate into other languages.  Sometimes they are just transcribed by the actual English letter, and other times by its actual pronunciation (which also varies).  For the most accurate transliteration, below is a table describing the different vowel sounds and their corresponding letters.

Hebrew has only 5 vowel sounds, with lack of discrimination in Hebrew between long and short vowels. In comparison, English which has around 12 vowel sounds (5 long, 7 short) depending on dialect. The English pronunciation can be known through prior context.

Vowels will sometimes be put into Hebrew by their letters, and not by their sounds, even though it is less accurate phonetically.  For example, any sort of "a" sound written with the letter "o", (ex. mom, monitor, soft), will often be transliterated as an "o" vowel, that is, with a vav (ו).  The same is the case for an -or ending (pronounced -er), it will also often be transliterated with a vav as well.  If the word with the "a" sound (such as "a" or "ah"), as in "ta ta", or "spa", it will be treated as an "a".

For full spelling, the niqqud (the "dots") is simply omitted, if partial vowelling is desired, especially for letters like Vav, then the niqqud is retained.

The picture of the "O" represents whatever Hebrew letter is used.

At the beginning or end of a word
The following are special cases for vowels at the beginning or end of a word. "O", "U", or "I" sound different at the beginning of a word, because they have no consonants before them. Therefore, Vav and Yud, by themselves, would be assumed to be their consonant versions ("V" and "Y" respectively) and not their vowel versions.

If the sounds (that is, vowels with no consonants before it) are made in the middle of a word, the same thing is done as shown below (or looking up, replace the "ס" with the aleph).

For full spelling, the niqqud (the "dots") are simply omitted.

See also
International Phonetic Alphabet
Help:IPA/Hebrew
Hebrew phonology
Hebrew alphabet
Romanization of Hebrew
Hebraization of surnames

References

 Hebrew Academy

External links
The International Phonetic Alphabet (revised to 2005) Symbols for all languages are shown on this one-page chart.

Hebrew language
Hebrew alphabet
Latin-script representations